Kande may refer to:

 Kande (film), a 2018 Punjabi movie
 Kandé, a town in Togo
 Kande (Nepal), a village in Nepal
 Kande language, a language of Gabon
 Electric blue kande, a fish of family Cichlidae
 Kande Lansana, Guinean footballer
 Moïse Kandé (born 1978), Senegalese-Mauritanian footballer

See also 
 Kandeh
 Cande (disambiguation)